Ulla-Britt Eklund (born 20 August 1934) is a Swedish former swimmer. She competed in the women's 200 metre breaststroke at the 1952 Summer Olympics.

References

External links
 

1934 births
Living people
Olympic swimmers of Sweden
Swimmers at the 1952 Summer Olympics
Swimmers from Stockholm
Swedish female breaststroke swimmers
20th-century Swedish women